Lincoln Marti Schools is a chain of schools in Florida owned by Demetrio Perez Jr. The schools were established by three of his friends.

References 

Schools in Florida